Macit Gürdal (born 1931) is a Turkish former footballer. He competed in the men's tournament at the 1952 Summer Olympics.

References

External links
 
 

1931 births
Possibly living people
Turkish footballers
Olympic footballers of Turkey
Footballers at the 1952 Summer Olympics
Place of birth missing (living people)
Association football forwards
MKE Ankaragücü footballers